The following lists events that happened during 2013 in Rwanda.

Incumbents 
 President: Paul Kagame 
 Prime Minister: Pierre Habumuremyi

Events

January
 January 1 - Rwanda joins the UN Security Council.

September
 September 16 - Paul Kagame along with the Rwandan Patriotic Front win the parliamentary election.

References

 
2010s in Rwanda
Years of the 21st century in Rwanda
Rwanda
Rwanda